Hot Chocolate is the second studio album by British soul band Hot Chocolate. It was released in November 1975 on the RAK Records label, owned by Mickie Most, who was the band's producer. The album peaked at number thirty-four on the UK Albums Chart and forty-one on the US Billboard 200 album chart.

The original 1975 LP release comprised ten original songs, of which only one ("You Sexy Thing") was credited to the band's writing team, lead vocalist Errol Brown and bassist Tony Wilson. Brown and Wilson wrote rest of the album separately, with the band members Harvey Hinsley, Patrick Olive and Tony Connor contributing "A Warm Smile". The album includes the group's best-known hit, "You Sexy Thing" and the top-10 UK and Irish hit "A Child's Prayer".

The album was issued on CD for the first time with six bonus tracks in 2009.

Track listing
All tracks written and composed by Errol Brown; except where indicated.

Side one
 "Hello America" – 3:25
 "The Street" – 5:09
 "Call the Police" (Tony Wilson) – 3:59
 "Dollar Sign" – 2:58
 "You Sexy Thing" (Brown, Wilson) – 4:05

Side two
 "A Child's Prayer" – 3:52
 "A Warm Smile" (Harvey Hinsley, Patrick Olive, Tony Connor) – 5:24
 "Amazing Skin Song" – 4:05
 "Love's Coming on Strong" (Wilson) – 3:42
 "Lay Me Down " (Wilson) – 3:29

CD bonus tracks (2009)
 "Cheri Babe" – 2:52
 "Sexy Lady" (Brown, Wilson) – 3:20
 "Blue Night" – 4:02
 "You Sexy Thing" (B-Side Version) (Brown, Wilson) – 4:01
 "Everything Should Be Funky" (Wilson) – 3:06
 "You Sexy Thing" (Single Version) (Brown, Wilson) – 4:04

Personnel
Hot Chocolate
Errol Brown – lead vocals
Harvey Hinsley – lead and acoustic guitars, backing vocals
Larry Ferguson – keyboards
Tony Wilson – bass guitar, vocals
Tony Connor – drums, backing vocals, electric piano
Patrick Olive – percussion, backing vocals, bass guitar

Additional
The CCS Horns – 2 trumpets, 1 trombone, alto, baritone and tenor saxophones
Mickie Most – producer
John Cameron – arrangements (1 to 3, 5, 7 to 16)
Phil Dennys – arrangements (4, 6)
P. Linard & Co. – album art

Charts

Certifications

References

Hot Chocolate (band) albums
1975 albums
Albums arranged by John Cameron (musician)
Albums produced by Mickie Most
Albums recorded at Morgan Sound Studios
Rak Records albums
Big Tree Records albums